FC Midtjylland Superleague Formula team is the racing team of FC Midtjylland, a football team that competes in Denmark in the Danish Superliga. The FC Midtjylland racing team competes in the Superleague Formula.

2009 season
For the 2009 Superleague Formula season, Kasper Andersen has been confirmed as the driver and Hitech Junior Team as the operating team.

Record
(key)

2009
Super Final results in 2009 did not count for points towards the main championship.

References

External links
 FC Midtjylland Superleague Formula team minisite
 Official FC Midtjylland football club website

FC Midtjylland
Superleague Formula club teams
2009 establishments in Denmark